Greta Gonda (1917–1974) was an Austrian stage and film actress who emigrated to Italy where she worked as a leading lady. She was born in Margarethe Tomicek Mondschein in Vienna, but left for Italy in the mid-1930s. In later life Gonda also worked as a sculptor.

Selected filmography
 Defendant, Stand Up! (1939)
 We Were Seven Widows (1939)
 Lo vedi come sei... lo vedi come sei? (1939)
 The Carnival of Venice (1939)
 Antonio Meucci (1940)
 Don Pasquale (1940)
 Pirates of Malaya (1941)
 Rossini (1942)
 The Queen of Navarre (1942)
 Harlem (1943)
 Eleven Men and a Ball (1948)

References

Bibliography 
 Gundle, Stephen. Mussolini's Dream Factory: Film Stardom in Fascist Italy. Berghahn Books, 2013.

External links 
 

1917 births
1974 deaths
Austrian film actresses
Italian film actresses
20th-century Italian actresses
Actresses from Vienna
Austrian emigrants to Italy